I Survived... is a documentary television series produced by NHNZ that aired on Lifetime Movie Network and, as of 2022, can be seen on Court TV.

The show allows survivors to explain in their own words how they overcame life-threatening circumstances without dramatic reenactments. Most episodes feature two or three separate stories involving scenarios such as kidnapping, assaults, or getting injured or stranded in a remote location. The format shows the survivor speaking into the camera to describe their experiences, with occasional use of title cards to summarize events, or photographs of locations or people mentioned by the narrators.

The official website states: 
The series premiered on March 24, 2008 and aired its last episode on January 26, 2015. Its sister series "I Survived... Beyond and Back" (in which people share their near death experiences) debuted in 2011.

Episodes

Season 1

Season 2

Season 3

Season 4

Season 5

Season 6

References

External links 
 
 Official Site on Lifetime Movie Network.com
 

2008 American television series debuts
2015 American television series endings
2000s American documentary television series
2000s American reality television series
2010s American documentary television series
2010s American reality television series
The Biography Channel shows